Polimeks İnşaat ve Sanayi A.Ş. is a Turkish holding company based in Istanbul. Polimeks, established in 1995 and grew to become one of the world’s leading construction companies, in recent years transformed into a global investment holding with activities in tourism, real estate, and renewable energy sectors. Polimeks primarily operates in Turkey, Russia and The Netherlands.

History 
In January 2013, the company received a contract to build the Ashgabat International Airport. Costing $2.1 billion in labor and operations, this is the largest construction project a Turkish firm has done abroad.

In 2007 in Moscow, the company built the first Ritz-Carlton hotel in Russia, on the site of the demolished high-rise hotel Intourist, on Tverskaya Street. In Turkey, the company built a hotel in Eskişehir and a paper mill in Kazakhstan.

According to the American magazine Engineering News-Record, Polimeks occupied 62nd place in the 2015 ranking of "225 Largest International Contractors".

See also
 Turkish construction and contracting industry

References

External links
 Polimeks official website 
 
 

Construction and civil engineering companies of Turkey
Companies based in Istanbul
Construction and civil engineering companies established in 1995
Turkish companies established in 1995